The 1993–94 FA Premier League (known as the FA Carling Premiership for sponsorship reasons) was the second season of the Premier League, the top division of professional football in England. Manchester United won the league by eight points over nearest challengers Blackburn Rovers, their second consecutive league title. Swindon Town finished bottom of the league in their first season of top-flight football and were relegated along with Sheffield United and Oldham Athletic. Manchester United also broke their own record of the most points in a season, set by themselves the previous season. This would be surpassed by Chelsea in the 2004–05 season.

Overview

New league sponsors
From the start of the 1993–94 season, the FA Premier League was sponsored by Carling Breweries.

Transfers
Just before the start of the season, Roy Keane became the most expensive footballer signed by an English football team. The 22-year-old Irish midfielder left relegated Nottingham Forest for Manchester United for a fee of £3.75 million.

During the 1993–94 season, many players were transferred between Premier League clubs for fees exceeding £1 million. They included David White (Manchester City to Leeds United), David Rocastle (Leeds United to Manchester City), Roy Wegerle (Blackburn Rovers to Coventry City) and Tim Flowers (Southampton to Blackburn Rovers). At £2.5 million, Flowers became the most expensive goalkeeper in English football.

Summary
Manchester United led the 1993–94 Premier League for almost all of the season, eventually finishing as champions eight points ahead of runners-up Blackburn Rovers. They also won the FA Cup after beating Chelsea 4–0 in the final, thereby becoming only the fourth team to achieve this feat in the 20th century (after Tottenham in 1961, Arsenal in 1971 and Liverpool in 1986). Their lead of the Premier League stood at 11 points by the end of October and peaked at 16 points two months later, but a run of bad results in March was followed by defeat at Blackburn at the beginning of April, which meant that they now led the league merely on goal difference. A return to form then saw United seal the league title with two games still to play.

Norwich City, Leeds United, Newcastle United, Everton and Aston Villa were among the sides who showed promise early in the season before Manchester United established a runaway lead. Norwich reached the third round of the UEFA Cup after famously beating Bayern Munich in the second round, but their league form slumped after manager Mike Walker departed to Everton in January, and the Norfolk side finished 12th. Everton's brief lead of the league in the opening stages of the season was followed by a slump in form, and manager Howard Kendall stepped down at the beginning of December with the Toffees now in the bottom half of the table. They only narrowly avoided relegation on the final day of the season. Aston Villa finished a disappointing 10th in the league, but won the Football League Cup for the fourth time.

Finishing runners-up in the Premier League were Blackburn Rovers. In third place came Newcastle United, whose 22-year-old striker Andy Cole was the Premier League's leading scorer with 34 goals in 40 games, with a total of 41 goals in all competitions. In fourth place came Arsenal, who achieved success in European competition with a 1–0 win over Parma in the Cup Winners' Cup final.

Swindon Town managed just five league wins all season and were relegated in bottom place having conceded 100 league goals in 42 games. Oldham Athletic, who had avoided relegation on goal difference the previous season, were relegated on the final day of the season after failing to win at Norwich City. The final relegation place went to Sheffield United, who were relegated from the top flight after a 3–2 defeat at Chelsea, with the winning goal coming in injury time (a draw would have been enough to survive, and a loss would have still been enough had Everton not won their final match, 3–2 at home to Wimbledon after coming from 0–2 down).

Teams
Twenty-two teams competed in the league – the top nineteen teams from the previous season and the three teams promoted from the First Division. The promoted teams were Newcastle United, West Ham United and Swindon Town. Newcastle United and West Ham United returned to the top flight after absences of four and one year respectively, while Swindon Town played in the top flight for the first time. They replaced Crystal Palace, Middlesbrough and Nottingham Forest, ending their top flight spells of four, one and sixteen years respectively.

Stadiums and locations

Personnel and kits
(as of 8 May 1994)

Managerial changes

League table

Results

Season statistics

Scoring

Top scorers

Hat-tricks 

Note: (H) – Home; (A) – Away

Top assists

Awards

Monthly awards

Annual awards

See also
1993–94 in English football

References and notes

External links
League and cup results for all the 1993/94 Premier Division clubs at footballsite
1993–94 Premier League Season at RSSSF

 
Premier League seasons
Eng
1993–94 in English football leagues